Mothusi Kenneth Montwedi is a South African politician. In 2019 he became a Member of Parliament in the National Assembly as a representative of the Economic Freedom Fighters party. Montwedi is the deputy provincial chair of the EFF in the North West.

In parliament, he is a member of the Portfolio Committee on Agriculture, Land Reform and Rural Development.

Montwedi was charged with contempt of parliament in 2020.

References

External links

Living people
Year of birth missing (living people)
Tswana people
Economic Freedom Fighters politicians
Members of the National Assembly of South Africa
21st-century South African politicians